Gary Donnelly (born June 3, 1962) is a former professional tennis player from the United States.

Donnelly still lives in Phoenix with his five children and wife, where he is a club pro at the Scottsdale Arizona Inn.

Donnelly played college tennis at Arizona State University.

Accomplishments 
 Career high ATP singles world ranking of No. 48
 Career high ATP doubles world ranking of No. 16
 8 ATP doubles titles
 Wimbledon doubles finals
 2 US Open doubles semi-finals
 US Open 4th round singles
 French Open doubles semi-finals
 #2 Davis Cup Doubles Team
 World Team Tennis Champion (San Antonio Racquets)
 Tournament of Champions finals
 Player/Coach for US World Team Cup
 1998 and 2004 Wimbledon Masters Finals
 #1 singles and doubles at Arizona State University
 Arizona State University Team Captain
 #1 Junior in Southwest Section Boys 16's and 18's
 Adidas National Advisory Staff
 2011 Central Arizona Tennis Hall of Fame

Grand Prix and WCT finals

Doubles (8 titles, 10 runner-ups)

References

External links
 
 

1962 births
Living people
American male tennis players
Arizona State Sun Devils men's tennis players
Sportspeople from Phoenix, Arizona
Tennis people from Arizona